Alan William Grahame (5 February 1954 – 3 October 2021) was a British Speedway rider.

Career
Grahame was born at Kingstanding, Birmingham, in February 1954. He finished runner-up to his brother Andy Grahame in the 1982 British Speedway Championship, and qualified for the Speedway World Championship Final in 1984 as reserve and scored five points from two rides.

He died at the age of 67 on 3 October 2021, from injuries sustained in a motocross racing crash the previous month.

World Final Appearances
 1984 –  Gothenburg, Ullevi – Reserve – 5pts

References

1954 births
2021 deaths
British speedway riders
English motorcycle racers
Birmingham Brummies riders
Stoke Potters riders
Hull Vikings riders
Swindon Robins riders
Poole Pirates riders
Cradley Heathens riders
Wolverhampton Wolves riders
Oxford Cheetahs riders
Sportspeople from Birmingham, West Midlands
Motorcycle racers who died while racing